Elijah Wayne Hughes (born March 10, 1998) is an American professional basketball player for the Wisconsin Herd of the NBA G League. He played college basketball for the East Carolina Pirates and the Syracuse Orange.

Early life
Hughes was born in Poughkeepsie, New York and grew up in Beacon, New York. He started playing basketball through the Catholic Youth Organization (CYO) and began playing on the Amateur Athletic Union (AAU) circuit for local coach, Kenney Dawson. Hughes became well-known in Beacon for his basketball ability, dominating games at Loopers Park.

High school career
Following his eighth-grade basketball season, Hughes was called up to the varsity team at Beacon High School in Beacon, New York. Early in high school, he mainly played the point guard position despite his exceptional size. After two years at the school, Hughes transferred to John F. Kennedy Catholic High School in Somers, New York with hopes of receiving more exposure.

As a junior, he led his team to a 26–2 record and runners-up finish at the Catholic High School Athletic Association (CHSAA) championship. Hughes was named first-team Class A All-State and CHSAA Class A most valuable player (MVP). He scored 42 points against Jamesville Dewitt High School. After the season, he committed to play college basketball for East Carolina. However, he struggled academically, in part due to the long commute and the school's competitive academic environment. To help improve his grades and meet National Collegiate Athletic Association (NCAA) requirements, Hughes transferred to South Kent School, a boarding school in South Kent, Connecticut, and later attended summer school. He became teammates with many other NCAA Division I prospects, including Tremont Waters and Myles Powell. Hughes was a three-star recruit and the No. 5 player in his state according to 247Sports.

College career
Hughes began his collegiate career at East Carolina. As a freshman, he averaged 7.8 and 2.3 rebounds in 27 games, missing seven games due to injury. The Pirates finished 15–18, and Hughes gained weight due to the injury. His season-high 19 points came against South Florida on December 28, 2016. Following the end of the season, Hughes announced that he would be leaving East Carolina.

Hughes decided to transfer to Syracuse over an offer from Seton Hall. After redshirting a year due to NCAA transfer rules, during which he improved his strength and diet, Hughes was named a starter for the Orange going into his redshirt sophomore season. He was the team's second leading scorer with 13.7 points per game while also averaging 4.3 rebounds, 1.5 assists and 1.2 steals per game. He took more three-pointers than any other teammate and made 36.9 percent of them. Hughes scored a career-high 25 points in the season-ending loss to Baylor in the NCAA tournament. Entering his junior season, Hughes was named to the watch list for the Julius Erving Award, which honors the top collegiate small forward. On February 11, 2020, Hughes left a game against NC State early with a lower body injury. At the conclusion of the regular season, Hughes was selected to the First Team All-ACC. As a junior, Hughes averaged 19 points, 4.9 rebounds, and 3.4 assists per game. After the season, he declared for the 2020 NBA draft.

Professional career

Utah Jazz (2020–2022)
Hughes was selected with the 39th pick in the second round of the 2020 NBA Draft by the New Orleans Pelicans. His draft rights were traded to the Utah Jazz. On November 24, 2020, the Utah Jazz announced that they had signed with Hughes. He was assigned to the Salt Lake City Stars of the NBA G League on February 15, 2021.

Portland Trail Blazers (2022)
On February 9, 2022, Hughes was traded to the Portland Trail Blazers in a three-team trade.

Wisconsin Herd (2022–present)
On November 3, 2022, Hughes was named to the opening night roster for the Wisconsin Herd.

Career statistics

NBA

Regular season

|-
| style="text-align:left;"| 
| style="text-align:left;"| Utah
| 18 || 0 || 3.6 || .333 || .348 || .750 || .5 || .3 || .1 || .1 || 1.7
|-
| style="text-align:left;"| 
| style="text-align:left;"| Utah
| 14 || 1 || 8.0 || .417 || .357 || 1.000 || 1.2 || .4 || .3 || .1 || 3.1
|-
| style="text-align:left;"| 
| style="text-align:left;"| Portland
| 22 || 3 || 14.6 || .296 || .224 || .667 || 1.9 || .7 || .5 || .3 || 3.8
|- class="sortbottom"
| style="text-align:center;" colspan="2"| Career
| 54 || 4 || 9.2 || .328 || .280 || .769 || 1.2 || .5 || .3 || .2 || 2.9

College

|-
| style="text-align:left;"| 2016–17
| style="text-align:left;"| East Carolina
| 25 || 7 || 20.5 || .349 || .273 || .684 || 2.3 || 1.3 || .6 || .4 || 7.8
|-
| style="text-align:left;"| 2017–18
| style="text-align:left;"| Syracuse
| style="text-align:center;" colspan="11"|  Redshirt
|-
| style="text-align:left;"| 2018–19
| style="text-align:left;"| Syracuse
| 34 || 34 || 32.7 || .420 || .369 || .742 || 4.3 || 1.5 || 1.2 || .8 || 13.7
|-
| style="text-align:left;"| 2019–20
| style="text-align:left;"| Syracuse
| 32 || 32 || 36.7 || .427 || .342 || .813 || 4.9 || 3.4 || 1.2 || .8 || 19.0
|- class="sortbottom"
| style="text-align:center;" colspan="2"| Career
| 91 || 73 || 30.7 || .411 || .342 || .763 || 4.0 || 2.1 || 1.0 || .7 || 13.9

Personal life
Hughes is the sixth of seven children. Hughes' father, Wayne, works for information technology company IBM. His mother, Penny, was a teacher's aide for Beacon City Schools before counseling at a methadone clinic. Hughes' older sister, Talah, played college basketball for Saint Peter's and scored over 1,000 career points.

References

External links

Syracuse Orange bio
East Carolina Pirates bio
Hughes speaks to the Inside Syracuse Basketball Podcast in 2023

1998 births
Living people
21st-century African-American sportspeople
African-American basketball players
American men's basketball players
Basketball players from New York (state)
East Carolina Pirates men's basketball players
New Orleans Pelicans draft picks
People from Beacon, New York
Portland Trail Blazers players
Salt Lake City Stars players
Small forwards
South Kent School alumni
Sportspeople from Poughkeepsie, New York
Syracuse Orange men's basketball players
Utah Jazz players